"Make My Day" is a novelty song recorded by American country music artist T. G. Sheppard featuring Clint Eastwood.  It was released in February 1984 as the second single from Sheppard's 1983 album  Slow Burn, although it was not included on the album until a 1984 revised release. The song reached #12 on the Billboard Hot Country Singles & Tracks chart.  The song was written by Dewayne Blackwell.

Content
The song describes the activities of Eastwood's film character Harry Callahan, with a variation of Callahan's trademark line "Go ahead, punk.  Make my day" as the chorus.

Chart performance

References

1984 singles
1983 songs
T. G. Sheppard songs
Clint Eastwood songs
Songs written by Dewayne Blackwell
Song recordings produced by Jim Ed Norman
Warner Records singles
Curb Records singles